Huacratanca (possibly from Quechua waqra horn, tanka fork) is a  mountain in the Urubamba mountain range in the Andes of Peru. It is located in the Cusco Region, Urubamba Province, Ollantaytambo District. It lies northwest of Salcayoc and Patacancha, and northeast of Huarmaripayoc.

References 

Mountains of Peru
Mountains of Cusco Region